The karate events at the 2001 World Games in Akita was played between 18 and 19 August. 85 athletes, from 29 nations, participated in the tournament. The karate competition took place at Tenno Town Gymnasium.

Participating nations

Medal table

Events

Men's events

Women's events

References

External links
 World Karate Federation
 Karate on IWGA website
 Results

 
2001 World Games
2001